India has several traditional games and sports, some of which have been played for thousands of years. Many of these games do not require much equipment or playing space. Some traditional Indian games are only played in certain regions of India, or may be known by different names and played under different rules in different regions of the country. Many Indian games are also similar to other traditional South Asian games.

History 

Kabaddi and kho-kho may have had certain aspects of their gameplay mentioned in the Mahabharata, which was written before 300 AD. Atya-patya is mentioned in the Naṟṟiṇai, written in 300 AD or before. Chaturanga is an ancient board game which experienced various modifications as it was transmitted from India toward Europe and became the modern game of chess.

Traditional Indian games served various purposes throughout and had various connections to Indian history; for example, certain aspects of the Bengali hopscotch game of ekka-dokka may have represented concepts of social division of property, and kabaddi may have been used as a preparation for hunting.

During the time of the British Raj, Indians began to focus more on playing British sports such as cricket, hockey, and football rather than their traditional sports. Part of the reason behind this was so that they could rise up the ranks by imitating the culture of the colonisers; later on, some Indians also started to see British sports as an activity in which they could "beat" their colonisers. A notable traditional Indian sport which continued to be played during this time was polo, which the British helped to codify and support as an official sport. Some British board games, such as Snakes and Ladders and Ludo, were also inspired by Indian board games.

In post-Independence India, kabaddi is the most popular traditional sport, with the highest viewership and most career opportunities; its growth was spurred on by the creation of the Pro Kabaddi League. Kho-kho has also had a franchise league started for it, Ultimate Kho Kho; the Pro Kabaddi League and Ultimate Kho Kho are respectively the most and third-most viewed non-cricket competitions in India.

In addition, the Indian government is starting the 'Bharatiya Games' initiative to revive traditional Indian games with the view that they are more affordable for rural Indians to play, and are important for reviving Indian culture as well as increasing team spirit.

Traditional games

Gilli Danda 
Gilli Danda is similar to many other games around the world, such as the English game of tip-cat, and also has similarities to the popular Indian sport of cricket. It is a game where a player hits a short stick on the ground up into the air using a longer stick held in their hand. They then hit the airborne stick with the hand-held stick again so that it travels as far as possible. If a player on the other team catches the stick before it touches the ground, then the hitter is out (eliminated).

Nondi 

Nondi (known by several other regional names) is a game similar to hopscotch. In it, several connected boxes are drawn on the ground, and players throw a rock or similar object onto one of the boxes and then attempt to hop their way to the box the rock lands in.

Ball games

Seven stones 
In the game of seven stones (which is known by several other names in different parts of India, such as Lagori or Pittu Garam), one team throws a ball at a pile of seven stones to knock it over and then attempts to re-create the pile as fast as possible, while the other team tries to throw the ball at the first team's players to eliminate them from the game.

Maram pitti 
Maram Pitti is similar to dodgeball; one player attempts to throw a ball from a stationary position at other players to eliminate them from the game.

Ball badminton 

Ball badminton is a native game of India that is similar to badminton.

Games involving simple objects

Marbles 
Some Indian games involving marbles are also known as Kancha/Kanche or Golli Gundu. Several games are played involving players flicking marbles at other marbles, often in order to "capture" as many marbles as possible by the end of the game.

Gutte 

Players throw a stone in the air, and then try to pick up as many of the remaining five stones on the ground as possible while making sure to catch the airborne stone before it falls.

Pambaram 

In Pambaram (also known as Bambaram, Lattu, and other names), the game revolves around making a spinning top spin without falling for as long as possible.

Variations of tag 

There are several Indian variations of the game of tag (sometimes referred to in India as "running and catching"), with kabaddi and kho-kho being the two most popular such games and being played in professional leagues (Pro Kabaddi League and Ultimate Kho Kho respectively).

Note: In many Indian variations of tag, the player who is supposed to tag the other players is referred to as the "denner".

Kabaddi 

In kabaddi, an offensive player known as the "raider" crosses into the other team's half of the court to try and tag as many of their players as possible. The raider must then return to his own team's half of the court without being stopped (tackled) by the opponents. If the raider makes it back safely, then he scores one point for every player he tagged; but if the opponents successfully stop the raider then the opponents score a point.

Kho-kho 
The kho-kho court is divided into two halves by a central lane which goes down the length of the court and connects two poles at either end of the court. All of the offensive players, except for the "attacker"/"active chaser", sit in the central lane. The attacker's goal is to tag the defensive players on the court in order to score points and eliminate the defensive players from the field. The attacker can not change direction once he starts running towards either pole, and also must not cross the central lane. However, the attacker can switch roles with a teammate by touching their back and shouting "kho".

Langdi 
Langdi is similar to tag, except that the offensive players are restricted to hopping on one foot while trying to tag players on the defensive team.

Atya-patya 

In atya-patya, the teams each have two turns on offense and two turns on defense. The offensive team scores points by having its players cross as many of the nine "trenches" on the field as possible while the defenders (who are restricted to standing within the trenches) try to stop this by tagging the offensive players to eliminate them.

Chor Police 

Chor Police (referred to as "cops and robbers" in other English-speaking countries) is a game where one team, the "Police", try to tag all the Chors (thieves) to put them into jail.

Oonch Neech

Dog and the bone 

In Dog and the Bone (known by various names in India, such as "Cheel Jhapatta", and more commonly in other parts of the world as "steal the bacon"), there is an object placed in the center of the field, with two teams placed on opposite ends of the field. One player from each team rushes towards the object to try to take it back to their team; a point is scored either if a player successfully retrieves the object, or if a player tags an opponent who is holding the object before the opponent safely makes it back.

River or mountain 
River or mountain, which is known as Nadee-Parvat in Hindi, and Nadi ki Pahad in Marathi and other regional languages, is a game where the field is divided into areas referred to as "rivers" and "mountains". At the start of play, the denner shouts out either "river" or "mountain", with all players then attempting to go to the areas referred to by the denner. While outside of those areas, the players can be tagged and eliminated by the denner.

Surr 
In Surr, the offensive team tries to go around the four quadrants of a square without being tagged by the defenders, who stand in the lanes between the quadrants.

Chain tag 
Chain tag involves the denner tagging other players, who are then required to form a chain with the denner by holding hands. Only the two players at either end of the chain can tag the remaining players (since they have a free hand not trapped in the chain.) The game ends once all players are part of the chain.

Lock and key 
Also prominently known as Vish-Amrit/Vish-Amrut (Poison-Antidote), lock and key is similar to the Western game of freeze tag, in which the denner(s) can "freeze" opponents by tagging them, with the frozen players' teammates able to "unfreeze" them by tagging them. A unique feature of lock and key is that players may be required to shout out "lock" or "key", as appropriate, when tagging other players.

Aankh micholi 

Aankh micholi is the Hindi name for blind man's buff (blindfolded tag).

Kokla chappaki 

One player goes around all the other players, who sit in a circle, and eventually drops a handkerchief behind one of them. That player must grab the cloth and then attempt to tag the first player.

Four corners 

Players attempt to run between the four corners of a square without being tagged by the denner, who is in the middle of the square. In a Telugu variation of the game, Nalugu Stambalata, there is a pole in each corner of the square that the players must touch.

Gella-Chutt 
One team has a king stationed at a distance from the "home". The goal of the king is to reach home without being stopped by the opponents, who themselves attempt to avoid being tagged out by the king's teammates, who start at home. A similar Bengali game exists known as "Bouchi", in which the players must hold their breaths upon leaving the home in order to be eligible to tag the opponents; failing to hold the breath leaves a player at risk of being tagged out by opponents.

Tree-climbing monkey 
The denner tries to tag players who can climb up trees to escape; these players can try to touch a stick kept within a circle on the ground in order to become safe from the denner.

Siya satkana 
Siya satkana is similar to tree-climbing monkey, except that it does not feature tree-climbing.

Combat sports

Wrestling

Gatta gusthi

Pehlwani

Martial arts

Gatka

Kalaripayattu

Silambam 
Silambam revolves around participants fighting using bamboo sticks.

Board games

Carrom 

Carrom is played on a small board, with gameplay similar to pool and billiards (cue sports). The main unique feature of carrom is that players flick a puck-like object with their fingers in order to impact the other pieces on the board, with each of the four players having two designated lines on their side of the board between which they must flick/shoot their striking piece from.

Chaturanga 
Chaturanga was an ancient Indian game which is the predecessor of chess.

Pachisi 

Two of the alternative versions of Pachisi are Ludo and Parcheesi.

Lambs and Tigers

Snakes and Ladders 
Snakes and Ladders originated from the Indian game of Gyan Chaupar.

Pallanguzhi 
Pallanguzhi is a variation of mancala.

Card games

Ganjifa

Boat racing

Vallam kali

Hiyang Tannaba

Other physical activities

Yoga

Mallakhamba 

Mallakhamba or mallakhamb involves athletes doing yoga or gymnastic aerial postures while gripping a pole.

Kite-flying 

Kite-flying is a popular activity in India, especially during certain holidays. In certain competitions, participants fly kites in an attempt to cut the strings of opposing participants' kites.

Events involving animals

Kambala 

Kambala involves one person racing a pair of bulls across a paddy field.

Jallikattu 

Jallikattu features people attempting to grab onto and stop a wild bull.

Miscellaneous games

Antakshari 

In Antakshari, participants sing songs, with the last letter of the song sung by one participant required to be the first letter of the next song sung by another participant.

Raja Chor Mantri Sipahi 
Raja Chor Mantri Sipahi involves players taking on various roles, with points scored based on guesses by one player as to the roles of the other players.

Traditional games in specific regions of India

Yubi lakpi 
Yubi lakpi is a traditional game played in Manipur with similarities to rugby.

Dhopkhel 
Dhopkhel is a traditional game of Assam with similarities to dodgeball and kabaddi. One team throws the ball at a player on the other team, who then attempts to catch the rebounded ball and make it back to his own team's half of the field without being tagged by any of the opponents. The team that gets more of its players successfully through this process by the end of the game wins.

See also 
History of India
List of Indian inventions and discoveries
Traditional games of Bangladesh
Traditional games of Pakistan
Traditional games of Andhra Pradesh

External links 

 https://bharatiyakhel.in/ - the official Indian government website for traditional Indian games

References 

Traditional sports of India
Traditional games
Indian games